Thyroid veins can refer to:
 Inferior thyroid veins
 Middle thyroid vein
 Superior thyroid vein